Ambedkar Nagar Lok Sabha constituency is one of the 80 Lok Sabha (parliamentary) constituencies in the Indian state of Uttar Pradesh. This  lok sabha constituency came into existence in 1996  as 11th lok sabha was held in April-May 1996. On 29 September 1995 Ambedkar Nagar district carved out from faizabad division (now Ayodhya)in the memory of Baba Saheb Dr. Bhim Rao Ambedkar.

Assembly segments
Presently, Ambedkar Nagar Lok Sabha constituency comprises five Vidhan Sabha (legislative assembly) segments. These are:

Katehari, Tanda, Jalalpur and Akbarpur assembly segments were earlier in erstwhile Akbarpur Lok Sabha constituency.

Members of Parliament

Election results

See also
 Ambedkar Nagar district
 List of Constituencies of the Lok Sabha

External links
Ambedkar Nagar lok sabha  constituency election 2019 result details
 2009-2014 Ambedkar Nagar Lok Sabha Election Results

Notes

Lok Sabha constituencies in Uttar Pradesh
Ambedkar Nagar district
2008 establishments in Uttar Pradesh
Constituencies established in 2008